Christopher McLaughlin (born 22 March 1998) is a Scottish professional footballer who plays for Lowland League side  East Kilbride.

Career
After beginning his career with Dundee United, McLaughlin signed for Ross County in July 2015. He moved on loan to Forfar Athletic in January 2017.

Having left Ross County in the summer of 2017, McLaughlin signed for Scottish Championship side Dumbarton on a one-year contract. He scored his first senior goal for the Sons, the opener in a 2–1 Scottish Challenge Cup victory over Raith Rovers in November 2017. After winning the club's Young Player of the Year award he left on the expiry of his contract following the Sons relegation to Scottish League One.

McLaughlin signed for National Premier Leagues Western Australia side Stirling Lions SC on a short term contract in July 2018. He then signed for Brechin City in June 2019.

McLaughlin signed for East Kilbride in November 2020.

Career statistics

References

1998 births
Living people
Scottish footballers
Dundee United F.C. players
Ross County F.C. players
Dumbarton F.C. players
Forfar Athletic F.C. players
Stirling Macedonia FC players
Brechin City F.C. players
Scottish Professional Football League players
National Premier Leagues players
Association football defenders
East Kilbride F.C. players